South Richmond may refer to:

Delta—South Richmond, a former federal electoral district in British Columbia, Canada
South Richmond High School, a high school in Staten Island, New York
South Richmond, Indiana, an unincorporated community in Wayne County
South Richmond, Virginia, part of the city of Richmond